Werauhia boliviana is a plant species in the genus Werauhia. This species is endemic to Bolivia.

References

boliviana
Flora of Bolivia